The 1984 Georgia Bulldogs football team represented the University of Georgia during the 1984 NCAA Division I-A football season.

Schedule

Roster
Lars Tate, Fr
Jimmy Holton, So

References

Georgia
Georgia Bulldogs football seasons
Georgia Bulldogs football